Flavihumibacter sediminis is a Gram-negative, rod-shaped, aerobic and non-motil bacterium from the genus of Flavihumibacter which has been isolated from tidal flat sediments from Ganghwa-do in Korea.

References

External links
Type strain of Flavihumibacter sediminis at BacDive -  the Bacterial Diversity Metadatabase

Chitinophagia
Bacteria described in 2016